The Meadowlands Rail Line, branded as the BetMGM Meadowlands Rail Line as part of a naming rights agreement, is a rail line in New Jersey, United States, operated by NJ Transit Rail Operations (NJT). Trains run between the Meadowlands Sports Complex and Secaucus Junction, some with continuing service to Hoboken Terminal. There is limited service on the line, with trains only operating in conjunction with major events.

The rail line was built at a cost of $185 million. Upon opening on July 20, 2009, it became the newest NJ Transit rail route. It is represented on NJT maps with the color gold, and uses the BetMGM logo.

Meadowlands station was built as a part of the rail network expansion and is next to MetLife Stadium, equidistant from Meadowlands Racetrack, Meadowlands Arena and American Dream.

Service
NJ Transit runs trains along the line for events where 50,000 or more attendees are expected, including New York Jets and New York Giants games. Trains begin running 3 hours before an event and stop up to two hours after its conclusion. Travel time between Meadowlands Station and Secaucus Junction is 10 to 13 minutes; a trip to or from Hoboken Terminal takes about 23 minutes. The agency considers full capacity to be 10,000 passengers per hour. 

Secaucus Junction is a major interchange station for NJ Transit where all but two of its commuter lines stop. Connections are available to the Northeast Corridor Line and the North Jersey Coast Line to New York Penn Station and Newark Penn Station and points south; the Morris and Essex Lines Midtown Direct to New York Penn Station and points west; the Main Line, the Bergen County Line, and the Pascack Valley Line to points north. At its eastern terminus Hoboken Terminal connections to PATH trains, Hudson Bergen Light Rail, New York Waterway ferries and local buses are available.

The Train to the Game was an excursion train operated jointly by Metro-North Railroad and NJ Transit, for Sunday football games starting at 1 pm. Trains running as part of this service originate at New Haven. They travel through southwestern Connecticut and Westchester County, Hell Gate Bridge, cross Manhattan via New York Penn (thus avoiding the normally required transfer from Grand Central Terminal,) and continue through the North River Tunnels as regular NJT trains to Secaucus Junction. When the service first began, three trains operated in each direction. However, this was reduced to one train in each direction starting with the 2010 football season.

New Jersey Transit began introducing online ticketing service by offering round-trip tickets from New York Penn Station to MetLife Stadium during the 2012 NFL season.

Despite officials indicating the line would begin daily service when the American Dream complex opened, which occurred in 2019, the Meadowlands Rail Line does not currently operate daily, with NJ Transit delaying the expansion of service until "the rail system is resilient enough that doing so won’t adversely affect NJ Transit commuters".

History

The Meadowlands Sports Complex, which opened in 1976, was until 2009 accessible only via automobile or bus. The decision to build a rail line along the chosen route was a source of controversy. A portion of the line is a  spur line connected via a new wye connection to the existing network. The line as built is a spur off the Pascack Valley Line, which travels further than if it had branched directly off the Bergen County Line. The decision to spend $6.2 million to acquire a right-of-way that travels through a federal Superfund site was also contentious.

The opening ceremonies for the line took place on July 20, 2009. New Jersey Governor Jon Corzine, New York Giants owner John Mara, New York Jets owner Woody Johnson, and players from the Giants and Jets rode a special train from Hoboken to the new station for a ribbon-cutting ceremony. The station opened to the public on July 26, 2009, for the championship game of the CONCACAF Gold Cup tournament between the United States and Mexico. It is estimated that 6,000 arrived via the new rail line.

Ridership to National Football League games increased by 50 percent in the rail line's second year of operation. In 2010, about 10,500 attendees at New York Jets games and 8,000 attendees at New York Giants games arrived by train.

In an operation dubbed the Mass Transit Super Bowl for Super Bowl XLVIII on February 2, 2014, record numbers of riders took the shuttle to Meadowlands before the game, and were faced with waits of up to 90 minutes, due to security delays. After the game ended there were more delays as demanded exceeded the Meadowlands station's regular operating capacity. At one point, fans were asked to remain inside the stadium until more trains were dispatched to load passengers from the station. In total 28,301 riders arrived at the stadium and 35,264 (nearly three times as many riders as NJ Transit predicted) left via train.

WrestleMania 35 in April 2019 was attended by 82,265 people, many of whom took the train. Due to scheduling delays, passengers had long waits before first trains departed after the event, leading to claims of incompetence NJ Transit, which had not adhered to its own schedule. NJ Transit officials claimed the 12:30 a.m. event ending caused the problem since some train engineers had reached the end of federal limit on work hours.

In anticipation of overflow crowds attending BTS performances in May 2019, NJ Transit advised departing concert-goers to find alternative transportation and planned additional bus service, saying that the line's capacity of 8,000 person per hour would be exceeded.

On September 14, 2022, NJ Transit entered into a naming rights agreement with BetMGM, a sports betting company owned by MGM Resorts International, to rename the line for $3 million over the next 3 years.

Stations

Alternative transit studies
In 2021 NJ Transit authorized studies to augment or replace the rail line with an alternative "transitway".

In January 2022, the New Jersey Department of Transportation announced the replacement of the eastbound Route 3 Bridge over the Hackensack River, which would incorporate provisions for a potential future expansion of the Hudson-Bergen Light Rail, ostensibly from Secaucus Junction.

References

NJ Transit Rail Operations
Transportation in Hudson County, New Jersey
Transportation in Bergen County, New Jersey
New Jersey Meadowlands District